This is a list of the Greek democracies for which there is some evidence in the Archaic period, following Eric Robinson's book The First Democracies (Stuttgart, 1997). Most of them probably pre-date the establishment of democracy in Athens by Cleisthenes in 508-507 BC.

References

Society of ancient Greece
Democracy